Statistics of DPR Korea Football League in the 2012 season:

Overview

Group stage
Seventeen teams took part in the 2012 national championships; in the first stage, they were divided into two groups. Group A consisted of April 25, Sobaeksu, Man'gyŏngbong, Wangjaesan, Sŏnbong, Kyŏnggong'ŏp, Wŏlmido, and Ryongnamsan, whilst Group B was made up of Ponghwasan, Myohyangsan, Maebong, Hwangryongsan, Amrokkang, Rimyŏngsu, P'yŏngyang City, Kigwanch'a, and Taeryŏnggang. April 25 and Sŏnbong finished first and second in Group A, whilst Maebong and Rimyŏngsu finished first and second in Group B.

Group A

Known results

Group B

Known results

Semi-finals
The top two finishers in each group advanced to the semi-finals, with the first-placed team of each group playing the second-placed team of the other group, the two match-ups being Maebong–Sŏnbong and April 25–Rimyŏngsu. Sŏnbong and April 25 advanced to the final, after Sŏnbong defeated Maebong 1–0 on a drenched pitch in heavy rain, and April 25 won their match against Rimyŏngsu 2–1.

Third-place match
The losing teams in the semi-finals played for third place. Both teams had been in the same group in the first stage of the competition, with Maebong having finished first in the group and Rimyŏngsu second; in the third place match, Rimyŏngsu handed Maebong a heavy 5–2 defeat in a match which saw Rimyŏngsu dominate from start to finish – making up for having lost 0–2 to Maebong in the group stage.

Final
The final featured a rematch between April 25 and Sŏnbong, who had finished first and second respectively in Group A in the first stage of the competition. Like in the group stage, April 25 won by one goal.

Cup competitions
April 25 won the Man'gyŏngdae Prize, and Rimyŏngsu won the Poch'ŏnbo Torch Prize. 

Rimyŏngsu also won a Technical Innovation Contest held in P'yŏngyang in June and July, with eleven wins, one draw and two losses for 25 points, with 19 goals for; April 25 finished second, equal in points with Rimyŏngsu but with one goal less, and Kigwancha finished third with 20 points. Twelve teams took part in the competition: April 25, Rimyŏngsu, Sobaeksu, Amrokkang, Maebong, Man'gyŏngbong, Ponghwasan, Myohyangsan, P'yŏngyang City, Kigwancha, Kyŏnggong'ŏp, and Ryongnamsan.

References

DPR Korea Football League seasons
1
Korea
Korea